Frankívs’kyj District is an urban district in the city of Lviv, named after the Ukrainian writer and social activist Ivan Franko. This district covers the southwestern part of the city. It contains such neighborhoods as Vulka, Kastelivka, Novyi Svit and Kulparkiv.

See also
Subdivisions of Ukraine

Frankivskyi District (Lviv)